ABC was the first American television network to broadcast the Pan American Games in 1963, when they devoted one episode of their Wide World of Sports anthology program to the games. The doubled their coverage to two episodes of the show in 1967.

1960s

1963

1967

Notes
On Saturday, July 29, ABC's Wide World of Sports (5-6:30 p.m. EST) aired highlights of the swimming and track-and-field events at the Pan American Games, live from Winnipeg, Canada.

1970s

1975

1979

1980s

1983

1987

1990s

1991

See also
List of Wide World of Sports (American TV series) announcers

References

External links
Sports / Non-ceremonial videos

 
Turner Sports
CBS Sports
ABC Sports
CBS Sports Spectacular
Announcers
ESPN announcers
CBC Sports
Lists of announcers of American sports events